Cephaloleia is a genus of beetle in the subfamily Cassidinae of family Chrysomelidae. It is endemic to the Neotropical realm.

Species 
As of 2014, there are 214 species described in the genus, including the following:
 Cephaloleia amblys
 Cephaloleia brunnea
 Cephaloleia cyanea
 Cephaloleia cylindrica
 Cephaloleia delectabilis
 Cephaloleia erugatus
 Cephaloleia eumorpha
 Cephaloleia facetus
 Cephaloleia formosus
 Cephaloleia immaculata
 Cephaloleia lepida
 Cephaloleia presignis
 Cephaloleia rubra
 Cephaloleia scitulus
 Cephaloleia splendida
 Cephaloleia triangularis
 Cephaloleia uhmanni
 Cephaloleia varabilis
 Cephaloleia viltata
 Cephaloleia weisei

References 

Cassidinae